Barrow  is a civil parish in Shropshire, England.  It contains 28 listed buildings that are recorded in the National Heritage List for England.  Of these, three are listed at Grade I, the highest of the three grades, three are at Grade II*, the middle grade, and the others are at Grade II, the lowest grade.  The parish contains the settlements of Barrow, Willey, Benthall, and  Linley, and is otherwise completely rural.  Four of the listed buildings are churches, two of which are at Grade I, and two at Grade II*.  The other Grade I listed building is a country house.  The rest of the listed buildings include farmhouses and farm buildings, other houses and cottages, a row of almshouses, a bridge, a chest tomb in a churchyard, and a war memorial.


Key

Buildings

References

Citations

Sources

Lists of buildings and structures in Shropshire